Uladzimir Uladzimiravich Varantsou (born 27 December 1991) is a Belarusian badminton player.

Achievements

BWF International Challenge/Series (1 runner-up) 
Mixed doubles

  BWF International Challenge tournament
  BWF International Series tournament
  BWF Future Series tournament

References

External links 
 

1991 births
Living people
Belarusian male badminton players